Li Hang (Chinese: 李行; born 19 September 1989) is a Chinese professional footballer who currently plays for Chinese Super League club Wuhan F.C.

Club career
In 2009, Li Hang started his professional footballer career with Hubei Greenery in the China League Two. He would eventually make his league debut for Wuhan on 8 March 2013 in a game against Jiangsu Sainty, coming on as a substitute for Yao Hanlin in the 71st minute. He would go on to part of squad that came runners-up within the division and gain promotion to the top tier at the end of the 2012 China League One season. After only one season within the top flight the club were relegated at the end of the 2013 Chinese Super League season.

On 25 February 2016, Li transferred to Chinese Super League side Hebei China Fortune. Li returned to Wuhan Zall on 26 February 2018. He would be an integral member of the squad and help gain promotion to the top tier for the club by winning the 2018 China League One division.

International career
On 10 December 2019, Li made his international debut in a 1-2 defeat to Japan in the 2019 EAFF E-1 Football Championship.

Career statistics 
Statistics accurate as of match played 31 December 2020.

Honours

Club
Wuhan Zall
 China League One: 2018

References

External links
 

1989 births
Living people
Chinese footballers
Footballers from Wuhan
Wuhan F.C. players
Hebei F.C. players
Chinese Super League players
China League One players
China League Two players
Association football midfielders
21st-century Chinese people